Rašid Mahalbašić (born 7 November 1990) is a Slovenian-born Austrian professional basketball player for San Pablo Burgos of the Spanish LEB Oro.

Professional career
Mahalbašić played with Kelag Wörthersee Piraten of the Austrian Bundesliga. In February 2010, he was on try-out at Montepaschi Siena from Italian Serie A.

In September 2010, Mahalbašić signed a six-year deal with Fenerbahçe Ülker of the Turkish Basketball League.

Mahalbašić was loaned to Tofaş S.K. between December 2010 to February 2011 where he played 10 games. He played with 14 points, 2 rebounds, 1 assist and 1 blok performance against Fenerbahçe Ülker.

He came back to Fenerbahçe Ülker after Mirsad Türkcan's shock injury, then he was loaned again, to KK Split of Croatia for the rest of the 2010–11 season.

In January 2012, Mahalbašić parted ways with Fenerbahçe, and signed with Slovenia's Zlatorog Laško for the rest of the 2011–12 season.

On September 21, 2012, he signed with Asseco Prokom Gdynia of the Polish Basketball League for the 2012–13 season.

On July 20, 2013, Mahalbašić signed a two-year deal with ČEZ Basketball Nymburk of the Czech Republic National Basketball League.

For the 2014–15 season he signed with Astana, a team from the VTB United League and Kazakh League.

On June 1, 2015, Mahalbašić signed a two-year contract with the Russian team Nizhny Novgorod. After one season he left Nizhny and on September 26, 2016, signed with Turkish club Yeşilgiresun Belediye. On December 5, 2016, he left Yeşilgiresun and signed with Spanish club Real Betis Energía Plus for the rest of the season.

On July 3, 2017, Mahalbašić signed with German club EWE Baskets Oldenburg.

On June 10, 2021, he signed with AS Monaco of the French LNB Pro A and the EuroLeague.

On August 3, 2022, he has signed with San Pablo Burgos of the LEB Oro.

Austria national team
Mahalbašić averaged 15.3 points, 9.7 rebounds and 1.0 assist per game, shooting 76% from the field goal and 53.3% on free throws, in 3 games with the Austrian national team in the qualifications for the Eurobasket 2009 Division B. when he won the tournament MVP.

Career statistics

Euroleague

|-
| style="text-align:left;"| 2012–13
| style="text-align:left;"| Asseco Prokom
| 10 || 4 || 21.5 || .582 || .000 || .591 || 6.8 || 1.3 || .5 || .4 || 9.1 || 11.1
|- class="sortbottom"
| style="text-align:left;"| Career
| style="text-align:left;"|
| 10 || 4 || 21.5 || .582 || .000 || .591 || 6.8 || 1.3 || .5 || .4 || 9.1 || 11.1

References

External links

 Rašid Mahalbašić at eurobasket.com
 Rašid Mahalbašić at euroleague.net
 Rašid Mahalbašić at fiba.com
 Rašid Mahalbašić at tblstat.net

1990 births
Living people
ABA League players
Asseco Gdynia players
Austrian expatriate basketball people in Germany
Austrian men's basketball players
Austrian people of Bosnia and Herzegovina descent
Austrian people of Bosniak descent
Austrian people of Slovenian descent
BC Astana players
BC Nizhny Novgorod players
CB Breogán players
CB Miraflores players
Centers (basketball)
Basketball Nymburk players
EWE Baskets Oldenburg players
Fenerbahçe men's basketball players
KK Split players
Liga ACB players
Power forwards (basketball)
Real Betis Baloncesto players
Slovenian expatriate basketball people in Croatia
Slovenian expatriate basketball people in Germany
Slovenian expatriate basketball people in Poland
Slovenian men's basketball players
Slovenian people of Bosnia and Herzegovina descent
Slovenian people of Bosniak descent
Sportspeople from Jesenice, Jesenice
Tofaş S.K. players
Yeşilgiresun Belediye players